Robert Louis Wade, Jr. (born February 26, 1981) is a former American football wide receiver. He was drafted by the Chicago Bears in the fifth round of the 2003 NFL Draft. He played college football at Arizona.

Wade also played for the Tennessee Titans, Minnesota Vikings, Kansas City Chiefs and Washington Redskins.

Early years
Wade attended Desert Vista High School in Phoenix, Arizona and was an all star Athlete student letterwinner in football, track & field, soccer and basketball. As a senior, he was the USA Today High School Football Player of the Year for Offense and Defense and he helped lead his team to the Class 5A State Championship. In track & field, he won the Class 5A triple jump title as a senior.

He received a 25th Anniversary award for an Friday Night Fever Offensive MVP (Terrell Suggs Defensive MVP) award from AZ local Channel 12

College career
Wade played three seasons for the University of Arizona Wildcats as a wide receiver.  In 33 games, he caught 230 passes for 3,351 yards and 22 touchdowns He was inducted into the Wildcat Ring of Honor in 2015. He currently holds the record for the most single season receptions with 93. He also the All time leader in Career Yards with 3,351 yards. Wade is still the most accomplished receiver Arizona has had.

Professional career

Chicago Bears
The Chicago Bears selected Wade in the fifth round of the 2003 NFL Draft. His best season with the team came in 2004 when he caught forty-two passes for 481 yards. In 2005, Wade saw more playing time as a punt returner and scored the first special teams touchdown of his career during the second week of the 2005 season.  He was released by the Bears late in the 2005 season.

Tennessee Titans
While leading the NFC in punt return average and yards Wade was released in week 13. After his release, Wade was signed by the Tennessee Titans and appeared in two games in 2005.  He remained with Titans in 2006 where he became a major offensive and special teams weapon in his 18 game Titan career. Wade was a very productive slot receiver with 50 receptions for 701 yards and 5 touchdowns.

Minnesota Vikings
On March 6, 2007, Wade signed a free agent contract worth 16 million dollars with the Minnesota Vikings and had the best season of his career.  Wade put up career high numbers in receptions (64), yards (747) and touchdowns (5).

In 2008. Wade finished with 58 catches for 645 yards and 5 touchdowns. Also, Wade's team made the playoffs for the first time in his career with Wade as a Captain. Wades first two years he led his team in receptions and punt return yards.

Wade was released by the Vikings three days before the Vikings first game of the 2009 season very unexpectedly. This happened just one week after agreeing to rework his contract and take a pay cut from $3 million to $1.5 million for this season. Wade also would have then become a free agent at the end of this season. Allowing him to test the free agent market after his best 3 years.

Kansas City Chiefs
Wade signed with the Kansas City Chiefs on September 14, 2009. Wade made himself at home quickly in Kansas City after missing the first 2 games Wade played week 3 in Kansas City and led his team in Receptions. Wade finished second on the team in receptions that year next to Dwayne Bowe.

Washington Redskins
Wade signed with the Washington Redskins on April 29, 2010.

References

External links
 Official Site
 Yahoo! Sports Profile

1981 births
Living people
Sportspeople from Orange County, California
Players of American football from California
Players of American football from Phoenix, Arizona
American football return specialists
American football wide receivers
Arizona Wildcats football players
Chicago Bears players
Tennessee Titans players
Minnesota Vikings players
Kansas City Chiefs players
Washington Redskins players